Marie Gerbron (born 23 December 1986, Harfleur) is a French-British handball player. She plays as a right winger.

She played for the British national team, and competed at the 2012 Summer Olympics in London.

Club career
Gerbron began playing handball as a school child and won the French Cup in 2006. From 2006 to 2009, she played with Le Havre AC, winning the Cup Winners' Cup three times. In 2012, she was playing club handball with French second tier side Octeville.

International career
Gerbron made her debut for Great Britain in 2010, qualifying for the team through her British mother. She made her Olympic debut against Montenegro, scoring six goals in a 31-19 defeat. She scored nine goals against Angola in the final game of the group stage. Great Britain lost all of their games in the tournament but media praised Gerbron's performances.

References

External links 
 

British female handball players
French female handball players
1986 births
Living people
Handball players at the 2012 Summer Olympics
Olympic handball players of Great Britain
People from Harfleur
Sportspeople from Seine-Maritime